Oganeditse Moseki (born 29 June 1979) is a Botswana sprinter. He competed in the men's 4 × 400 metres relay at the 2004 Summer Olympics.

References

External links
 

1979 births
Living people
Athletes (track and field) at the 2004 Summer Olympics
Botswana male sprinters
Olympic athletes of Botswana
Place of birth missing (living people)
African Games medalists in athletics (track and field)
African Games gold medalists for Botswana
Athletes (track and field) at the 2003 All-Africa Games